Methylosome subunit pICln is a protein that in humans is encoded by the CLNS1A gene.

Interactions 

CLNS1A has been shown to interact with:
 ITGA2B, 
 PRMT5,
 SNRPD1, and
 SNRPD3.

See also 
 Chloride channel

References

Further reading

External links 
 
 

Ion channels